Petite Martinique is one of the islands of Carriacou and Petite Martinique, which is a dependency of Grenada.

It is 4 km (2½ miles) away from Carriacou. With its  and population of 900, it is smaller than Carriacou. Petite Martinique comprises about 9.8% of the total area and 10% of the entire population of Carriacou and Petite Martinique which is estimated at 10,000. The islanders live by boat-building, fishing and seafaring.

History 
The first settler on Petit Martinique was a Mr. Pierre from Martinique, who left his home island shortly after 1700 seeking new fertile land to grow sugarcane and cotton.  The island was owned by him and his wife ('Madame Pierre'), their children and their slaves. Hence, the largest village was named Madame Pierre after the wife of the French owner. It is thought that he named the island Petit (little) Martinique because he thought its shape resembled that of Martinique.

Colonial history 
On 27 September 1650, Jacques du Parquet bought Grenada from the Compagnie des Îles de l'Amérique, which was dissolved, for the equivalent of £1160. In 1657, Jacques du Parquet sold Grenada to Jean de Faudoas, Comte de Sérillac for the equivalent of £1890. In 1664, King Louis XIV bought out the independent island owners and established the French West India Company. In 1674 the French West India Company was dissolved.  Proprietary rule ended in Grenada, which became a French crown colony.

Petite Martinique was part of the French colony in 1762. It was part of the British West Indies Grenada colony from 1763-1779 and 1783-1974. It was part of French Grenada colony from 1779-1783. It has been a dependency of Grenada since 1974.

Recent history 

The majority of the inhabitants today are of Indian, Scottish, Portuguese, French and African descent. There still is a British influence on the island as it was colonised by the British Empire and it is part of Grenada, a Commonwealth state. The only French influence is demonstrated in village names, such as L'Esterre, La Resource, Beausejour, and others.  However, the local dialect is English-based creole languages.

The Sacred Heart Church was the first Roman Catholic church on Petite Martinique and the first wooden building. It was destroyed by a hurricane in the 1940s and the Church standing today was built in 1947.

Though Hurricane Ivan in 2004 dealt a devastating blow to the island of Grenada, Carriacou and Petite Martinique suffered significantly less damage. However, in 2005, Hurricane Emily hit Carriacou, damaging and forcing evacuation of its only hospital and destroying or damaging hundreds of homes.

Education 
Petite Martinique RC School is the only school in the island, so other schoolchildren travel by boat to schools in nearby Carriacou.

References

Islands of Grenada